American International Records was a record label which was a subsidiary of American International Pictures that was used to release music from their films. It also released recordings from individual artists.

Background
AIP started their own record label, American International Records, in 1959. The manager was Don Leon. That year he announced that Al Simms replaced Jimmy Madden as the head of A&R.

As a division of American International Pictures, it was used to release recorded music soundtracks from the film companies B grade film productions. One such film was Bucktown which featured a  score that was written by Johnny Pate, and having the main theme sung by Luther Rabb. The soundtrack was released on American International Records  AIR 4477 in 1975.

References

External links
 Discogs: American International Records

1959 establishments in the United States
American record labels
Pop record labels
Record labels established in 1959
Rock record labels
Soundtrack record labels